Steinslandsvatnet is a lake in the municipality of Modalen in Vestland county, Norway.  The  lake is the headwaters of the river Moelva in the center of the Modalen valley.  The village of Øvre Helland lies at the southern end of the lake.  The Norwegian county road 345 runs along the western shoreline of the lake.

See also
List of lakes in Norway

References

Modalen
Lakes of Vestland